Club Deportivo Teruel is a Spanish football team based in Teruel, in the autonomous community of Aragon. Founded in 1954, the club plays in the Segunda División RFEF – Group 3, and holds home games at Estadio Pinilla, with a capacity of 4,500 seats.

History
Founded in 1954, the club spent two seasons in Tercera Regional, the lowest category of the region, before taking SD Montañesa's place in Tercera División. It first reached Segunda División B in 1987.

On 13 June 2018, Teruel signed a collaboration agreement with SD Huesca for three years.

Season to season

8 seasons in Segunda División B
1 season in Segunda División RFEF
43 seasons in Tercera División

Current squad

Honours
Tercera División (3): 2000–01, 2009–10, 2017–18

Famous players
 Raúl Fabiani
 David Mitogo
 Sena
 Sipo
 Luis Milla
 Javier Oliete

References

External links
Futbolme team profile 
Estadios de España 

 
Football clubs in Teruel
Association football clubs established in 1946
1946 establishments in Spain